This is a list of football (soccer) stadiums in Senegal, ranked in descending order of capacity. The largest stadium in Senegal which is not used for football is the 20,000-capacity National Wrestling Arena in Pikine.

This list is not comprehensive. It includes:

 The stadiums of all clubs in the top four tiers of the Senegalese football league system as of the 2016–17 season (Ligue 1 to National 2), with rankings within each league given.
 The stadiums of teams from Senegal  which play in national leagues of other football associations, as of the 2016-17 season.
 All other football stadiums with a capacity of at least 5,000.

Existing stadiums

See also 
List of association football stadiums by capacity
List of African stadiums by capacity

References 

 
Senegal
Football in Senegal
Football stadiums